Mississagua Lake is a lake in the Kawartha Highlands in Ontario, Canada. It borders the western section of the Kawartha Highlands Signature Site Park. The area contains several privately owned cottages and over the last 5–10 years it has become a popular destination for several successful business owners/executives, as well as several professional ice hockey players in the NHL.

See also
List of lakes in Ontario

References

Lakes of Peterborough County